Professor Théophile Mbemba Fundu was the Interior Minister of the Democratic Republic of Congo from 2001 until 2006. He was governor of Kinshasa from 1997 until 2001.

See also 
Ituri conflict

References

People from Kinshasa
Governors of Kinshasa
Government ministers of the Democratic Republic of the Congo
Living people
Year of birth missing (living people)
Governors of provinces of the Democratic Republic of the Congo